The UNLV Rebels baseball team is a varsity intercollegiate athletic team of the University of Nevada, Las Vegas in Paradise, Nevada, United States. The team is a member of the Mountain West Conference, which is part of the National Collegiate Athletic Association's Division I. UNLV's first baseball team was fielded on February 25, 1967. The team plays its home games at Earl Wilson Stadium in Paradise, Nevada. The Rebels are coached by Stan Stolte.

Year-by-year results

Major League Baseball
UNLV had 121 Major League Baseball Draft selections since the draft began in 1965.

See also
 List of NCAA Division I baseball programs

References

External links
 

 
Baseball teams established in 1967